The 2024 United States House of Representatives elections in Texas will be held on November 5, 2024, to elect the thirty-eight U.S. representatives from the State of Texas, one from each of the state's congressional districts. The elections will coincide with the 2024 U.S. presidential election, as well as other elections to the House of Representatives, elections to the United States Senate, and various state and local elections.

District 6

The 6th district encompasses Ellis County and Palestine. The incumbent is Republican Jake Ellzey, who was re-elected unopposed in 2022.

Republican primary

Candidates

Declared
Cliff Wiley, high school teacher

Potential
Jake Ellzey, incumbent U.S. Representative

General election

Predictions

District 7

The 7th district encompasses the suburbs of Houston such as Gulfton and Alief. The incumbent is Democrat Lizzie Fletcher, who was re-elected with 63.8% of the vote in 2022.

Democratic primary

Candidates

Declared
Pervez Agwan, renewable energy developer

Potential
Lizzie Fletcher, incumbent U.S. Representative

General election

Predictions

District 12

The 12th district contains most of Parker County and the western half of Tarrant County, including central Fort Worth. The incumbent is Republican Kay Granger, who was re-elected with 64.3% of the vote in 2022.

Republican primary

Candidates

Publicly expressed interest
Kay Granger, incumbent U.S. Representative

General election

Predictions

District 15

The 15th district stretches from western Hidalgo County in the Rio Grande Valley, northward into rural counties in the Greater San Antonio area. The incumbent is Republican Monica de la Cruz, who flipped the district and was elected with 53.3% of the vote in 2022.

Republican primary

Candidates

Potential
Monica de la Cruz, incumbent U.S. Representative

General election

Predictions

District 23

The 23rd district covers southwestern Texas, including the Big Bend, the southern and western San Antonio suburbs, and the southwestern El Paso suburbs. The incumbent is Republican Tony Gonzales, who was re-elected with 55.9% of the vote in 2022. In 2023, Gonzales was censured by the Texas Republican Party due to his vote for the Bipartisan Safer Communities Act.

Republican primary

Candidates

Declared
Victor Avile, former ICE special agent and candidate for Land Commissioner in 2022
Julie Clark, chair of the Medina County Republican Party

Formed exploratory committee
Frank Lopez Jr., retired U.S. Border Patrol agent and independent candidate for this district in 2022

Potential
Tony Gonzales, incumbent U.S. Representative

General election

Predictions

District 28

The 28th district is based in the Laredo area and stretches north of the Rio Grande Valley into east San Antonio. The incumbent is Democrat Henry Cuellar, who was re-elected with 58.3% of the vote in 2022.

Democratic primary

Candidates

Potential
Jessica Cisneros, immigration attorney and candidate for this district in 2020 and 2022
Henry Cuellar, incumbent U.S. Representative

General election

Predictions

District 32

The 32nd district covers northern and eastern Dallas and its inner northern suburbs. The incumbent is Democrat Colin Allred, who was re-elected with 65.6% of the vote in 2022. Allred is considered a potential candidate for U.S. Senate.

Democratic primary

Candidates

Potential
Colin Allred, incumbent U.S. Representative
Julie Johnson, state representative

Declined
Victoria Neave, state representative

General election

Predictions

District 34

The 34th district stretches from McAllen and Brownsville in the Rio Grande Valley, northward along the Gulf Coast. The incumbent is Democrat Vicente Gonzalez, who was re-elected with 52.7% of the vote in 2022.

Democratic primary

Candidates

Potential
Vicente Gonzalez, incumbent U.S. Representative

Republican primary

Candidates

Declared
Mauro Garza, nightclub owner and perennial candidate

Potential
Mayra Flores, former U.S. Representative

General election

Predictions

References

2024
Texas
United States House of Representatives